TXU Energy is an American retail electricity provider headquartered in Irving, Texas, serving residential and business customers in deregulated regions of Texas since the deregulation of the Texas electricity market in 2002. A subsidiary of Vistra Corp, it is one of the largest retail electricity providers in Texas.

History 
The first instance of electricity generation in North Texas dates to 1882 when Dallas Electric Lighting Company, an indirect TXU Energy predecessor, began providing electric light service to the city of Dallas. A few years later, in 1885, Fort Worth Electric Light and Power Company, another indirect TXU Energy predecessor, was founded and began servicing areas west of Dallas.

A number of electric companies formed in the years that followed: TXU Energy's direct forerunners, the Texas Power & Light Company (TP&L); Dallas Power & Light (DP&L), to serve the Dallas area; and Texas Electric Service Company (TESCO) to serve Fort Worth and areas west of Abilene.

In 1984, DP&L, TESCO, and TP&L merged as divisions of a new principal subsidiary, Texas Utilities Electric Company.

In 1999, the company was renamed TXU Corp., positioning itself as a multinational energy company, eventually competing in electricity markets on three continents: Australia, Europe and North America.  It eventually discontinued all operations outside of North America in 2002.

Deregulation 
On May 21, 1999, the Texas Legislature passed Senate Bill 7 (SB 7), which required the creation of a competitive retail electricity market. TXU Energy was one of the first certified retail electricity providers to begin offering service at market open in 2002. TXU Corporation’s three main entities during the first several years of deregulation were TXU Energy, a retail electricity provider (REP), TXU Electric Delivery, a transmission and distribution utility (TDU) and TXU Power, a wholesale electricity generation provider.	

In 2007, through a private-equity acquisition led by KKR, TPG Capital and Goldman Sachs, TXU Corporation was acquired by Energy Future Holdings Corp. (EFH).   TXU Energy retained its name, while TXU Power was renamed Luminant, and TXU Electric Delivery was renamed Oncor.

On April 29, 2014, Energy Future Holdings (EFH), TXU Energy’s parent company at the time, entered bankruptcy.  In October 2016, certain subsidiaries of EFH, including TXU Energy, Luminant and EFH’s corporate services department, emerged from reorganization in a court-approved spin-off under parent company Texas Competitive Electric Holdings (TCEH), and a new CEO, Curt Morgan, was announced. Later in 2016, TCEH changed its name to Vistra Energy.

TXU Energy's parent company, Vistra Energy, began trading on the New York Stock Exchange on May 10, 2017.

Community and Conservation Initiatives 
TXU Energy participates in a variety of community initiatives and environmental conservation efforts in Texas.

TXU Energy Aid 
TXU Energy Aid began in 1983 to help customers who don’t have the means to pay for electricity service. Since its inception, TXU Energy Aid has aided 455,000 customers, totaling more than $84 million in assistance. Funds are raised from employee and customer donations.

Committed to Community Growth Program 
Through its Committed to Community Growth program, TXU Energy partners with the Texas Trees Foundation to plant trees in communities across Texas. Located at Richland College, the TXU Energy Urban Tree Farm and Education Center is the largest nonprofit urban tree farm in the nation.  The tree farm produces trees for the community and allows volunteers to log hours by planting, mulching and pruning. Through its partnership with the Texas Trees Foundation, over 240,000 trees have been planted across the state.

Houston Zoo 
TXU Energy recently passed the $1 million mark in donations to the Houston Zoo. The company has been the presenting sponsor of the Houston Zoo's Chill Out program since 2011 and Zoo Lights since its inception. In addition, TXU Energy has sponsored other events such as the zoo's annual Gift of Grub campaign, which matches donations up to $50,000.

See also
List of Texas companies (T)

References

External links
 

Energy companies established in 2002
Electric power transmission system operators in the United States
Non-renewable resource companies established in 2002
Companies based in Irving, Texas
2002 in Texas
Vistra Corp